is a Japanese professional sumo wrestler from Kumamoto. He made his debut in 2003, and reached the top makuuchi division eleven years later in 2014. His highest rank has been maegashira 1. He has been a runner-up in one tournament, and has won two special prizes for Fighting Spirit and one gold star for defeating a yokozuna.

Early life and sumo background
Matsumura was born the oldest son of the sumo star also known as Sadanoumi who was active in the 1980s, who reached the rank of komusubi and was well known for his swift sumo technique. Matsumura aspired from a young age to follow in his father's footsteps and upon graduation from junior high school in 2003 he joined Sakaigawa stable which was founded by former komusubi Ryōgoku who had himself been a protege of the senior Sadanoumi.

Career
From the January 2004 tournament, he took the shikona surname of his father. Being a lighter wrestler, he struggled to succeed for a number of years, but in November 2007 he managed to take the sandanme division championship with a perfect 7–0 record. This championship catapulted him from sandanme 44 into the third division at the rank of makushita 27. Despite this achievement he would struggle in makushita for 3 more years until January 2010 when he took his second championship with another 7–0 record. This would put him in upper makushita where after two tournaments he was promoted to the salaried ranks of jūryō for the first time in July 2010. This was the first time in 14 years that the son of a former sekitori was promoted to sekitori himself; the last time being the father and son Tochiazuma Tomoyori and Tochiazuma Daisuke. He lasted eight tournaments in the division before being demoted again, sitting out his last tournament in jūryō with a dislocated ankle. As before he began to struggle again in makushita and would remain there for twelve tournaments before working his way back up and finally re-entering jūryō in January 2014. This time around he found his stride quickly and was able to rise through jūryō in only two tournaments with two strong performances. He was promoted to the top division makuuchi in May 2014. His made a splash in his top division debut, earning a 10–5 record and the Fighting Spirit prize. Sumo historians noted that Sadanoumi had repeated his father's same impressive achievement of earning the Fighting Spirit prize in his makuuchi debut 34 years earlier in 1980. This was the first such repeat in the history of sumo.

For a few tournaments after his makuuchi debut, when he appeared in the ring entering ceremony, Sadanoumi wore a keshō-mawashi with the official Kumamoto prefectural mascot Kumamon on it to promote his home prefecture.

Sadanoumi has a chronic disease of the cornea which severely limits his vision. In order to avoid risky surgery he wears special hard contacts every night that dramatically improve his vision for the following day.

He first fought all the top wrestlers ranked at maegashira #2 in the March 2015 tournament and posted a respectable 7–8 score that kept him ranked high enough to face all the top competition in the following tournament, where he scored his first kinboshi for defeating a yokozuna Harumafuji and posted a winning record of 8–7, also beating the eventual tournament champion, Terunofuji.  He was nominated for the Outstanding Performance Prize, normally given to those who beat the tournament champion or a yokozuna and manage a winning record, but there was opposition since he posted a bare minimum winning record with one win by default and the prize was not awarded. Nonetheless he was promoted to his highest rank to date of maegashira 1 for the July 2015 tournament. Since then his results have been disappointing and he slid down the maegashira ranks with seven consecutive make-koshi or losing scores from July 2015 to July 2016. He was able to get a winning record in September 2016 with an 8–7, however he got another losing record in the November 2016 tournament, scoring only 3–12 which was his worst record to date in the top division. He was demoted to the jūryō division after the March 2017 tournament, breaking a run of 18 straight tournaments at a maegashira rank, the longest amongst active wrestlers. However, a 9–6 record at the rank of Jūryō 1 East was enough for an immediate return to the top division. He missed the first five days of the September 2017 tournament because of an injury to his right leg,  and although he entered from Day 6, he could not prevent demotion to jūryō. In March 2018 he won the jūryō division championship with an 11–4 record, beating Akiseyama in a playoff, to ensure his return to makuuchi. Despite never rising higher than maegashira 8 he remained in the top division until January 2021. After four tournaments in jūryō he returned to makuuchi in November 2021. In May 2022 he scored eleven wins against four losses to share runner-up honours alongside Takanosho and Daieisho, and received his second Fighting Spirit Prize and first since 2014.

Fighting style
Sadanoumi is a yotsu-zumō wrestler who prefers grappling techniques to pushing or thrusting. His favored grip on his opponent's mawashi or belt is migi-yotsu, a left hand outside, right hand inside position. His most common winning kimarite is yori-kiri, a straightforward force out, which accounts for around 40 per cent of his victories. He is also fond of uwate-nage (overarm throw).

Personal life
Sadanoumi was married in June 2017 to a nurse who lives nearby his heya, after a five year relationship. Around 600 guests attended their wedding ceremony. Their first child is expected in January 2018.

Career record

See also
List of sumo tournament top division runners-up
List of sumo tournament second division champions
List of active gold star earners
Glossary of sumo terms
List of active sumo wrestlers
Active special prize winners

References

External links
 

1987 births
Living people
Japanese sumo wrestlers
Sumo people from Kumamoto Prefecture